Natiq Aghaami oglu Aliyev (November 23, 1947 – June 9, 2017) was an Azerbaijani politician. He served as the president of the State Oil Company of Azerbaijan Republic and was the Minister of Industry and Energy of Azerbaijan Republic at the time of his death.

Early life
Aliyev was born on November 23, 1947 in Baku, Azerbaijan. He graduated from secondary school in 1965. In 1970, he graduated from Azerbaijan State Oil Academy. He has a PhD in Geology-Mineralogy Sciences. He started working in the field once he was employed by Xəzərdənizneft state concern in 1970. Starting from 1984, Aliyev was appointed the Chief Instructor of Department at the administration of Central Committee of Azerbaijan Communist Party. In 1989-1991, he worked as Director of the Economic-Social Issues Department. In 1992, he appointed the Director of Ipesko representative office in Baku. At the same time, he worked as a consultant at SOCAR conducting research work for geophysical and geological projects, consulted on exploration and development, transportation and refining of oil, etc.

Political career
In 1993, he was appointed the Chairman of Board of Director and President of State Oil Company of Azerbaijan Republic by President Heydar Aliyev. He retained the post of the President until December 6, 2004 when he was appointed the Minister of Industry and Energy of Azerbaijan Republic. Rovnag Abdullayev replaced Aliyev as the head of SOCAR.

Death
Aliyev died on June 9, 2017 at Florence Nightingale Hospital in Istanbul from a heart ailment after suffering a heart attack the week before in Baku.

Works and awards
Aliyev was the Chairman of the State Committee for Development of Azeri-Chirag-Guneshli fields and is the Chairman of the Board of Directors of Baku-Tbilisi-Ceyhan (BTC). He authored more than 100 scientific publications, articles and books. In 2008, he was elected a member of the International Engineering Academy in Moscow. Aliyev has been awarded with Shohrat Order due to service in development of oil industry in Azerbaijan Republic. He was also awarded with Order of the Glory of Georgia, Legion d’Honneur of France and Meritted Engineer Medal of Azerbaijan Republic.

See also
Cabinet of Azerbaijan

References 

1947 births
2017 deaths
Politicians from Baku
Government ministers of Azerbaijan
Energy in Azerbaijan
People in the petroleum industry
Recipients of the Shohrat Order
Recipients of the Legion of Honour
Azerbaijan State Oil and Industry University alumni
Energy ministers